The 2022 Ligas Departamentales, the fifth division of Peruvian football (soccer), was played by variable number teams by Departament.

Liga Departamental de Amazonas

First stage

|-
|}

Second stage

|-
|}

Semifinals

|-
|}

Finals

|-
|}

Liga Departamental de Áncash

First stage

|-
|}

Second stage

|-
|}

Quarterfinals

|-
|}

Semifinals

|-
|}

Finals

|-
|}

Liga Departamental de Apurímac

First stage

|-
|}

Second stage

|-
|}

Semifinals

|-
|}

Finals

|-
|}

Liga Departamental de Arequipa

First stage

|-
|}

Second stage

|-
|}

Tiebreaker 

|}

Liguilla

Liga Departamental de Ayacucho

First stage

|-
|}

Second stage

|-
|}

Third stage

|-
|}

Semifinals

|-
|}

Final

|}

Liga Departamental de Cajamarca

First stage

|-
|}

Second stage

|-
|}

Third stage

|-
|}

Semifinals

|-
|}

Liga Departamental del Callao

Group stage

Group A

Group B

Group C

Semifinals

|}

Final

|}

Liga Departamental de Cusco

Group stage

Group A

Group B

Group C

Group D

Group E

Group F

Quarterfinals

|-
|}

Semifinals

|-
|}

Final

|}

Liga Departamental de Huancavelica

First stage

|-
|}

Group A

Group B

|}

Finals

|-
|}

Liga Departamental de Huánuco

First stage

|-
|}

Second stage

|-
|}

Semifinals

|-
|}

Finals

|-
|}

Liga Departamental de Ica

First stage

|-
|}

Second stage

|-
|}

Semifinals

|-
|}

Final

|-
|}

Liga Departamental de Junín

Group stage

Group A

Group B

Group C

Group D

Group E

Second stage

Group A

Group B

Group C

Liguilla

Liga Departamental de La Libertad

Zona Costa

Group A

Group B

Group C

Tiebreaker

|}

Semifinals

|-
|}

Zona Ande

Group A
 Racing and Ciclón Santiaguino were disqualified for serious incidents and suspended for one year from the Copa Perú.

Group B

Liguilla

Liga Departamental de Lambayeque

Group stage

Group A

Group B

Group C

Quarterfinals

|-
|}

Semifinals

|-
|}

Final

|}

Liga Departamental de Lima 
 A total of 16 teams compete in the tournament, which began on 10 July and is scheduled to end on 14 August 2022.

Round of 16

|-
|}

Quarterfinals

|-
|}

Semifinals

|-
|}

Finals

|}

Liga Departamental de Loreto

Group stage

Group A

Group B

Group C

Tiebraker

|}

Group D

Liguilla

Liga Departamental de Madre de Dios

Semifinals

|-
|}

Final

|}

Liga Departamental de Moquegua

Standing

Liga Departamental de Pasco

First stage

Semifinals

|-
|}

Finals

|-
|}

Liga Departamental de Piura

Group stage

Group A

Group B

Group C

Group D

Tiebraker 

|}

Semifinals

|-
|}

Finals

|-
|}

Liga Departamental de Puno 
 The club Fuerza Minera withdrew before the start of the tournament.

First stage

Group A

Group B

Group C

Group D

Group E

Second stage

Group A

Group B

Group C

Semifinals

|-
|}

Final

|}

Liga Departamental de San Martín

First stage

Zona Norte

|-
|}

Zona Centro

|-
|}

Zona Sur

|-
|}

Second stage

Zona Norte

|-
|}

Zona Centro

|-
|}

Zona Sur

|-
|}

Third stage

|-
|}

Tiebraker 

|}

Semifinals

|-
|}

Liga Departamental de Tacna 
 A total of 8 teams compete in the tournament, which began on 9 July and is scheduled to end on 14 August 2022.

First stage

|-
|}

Liguilla

Second Place play-off

|}

Liga Departamental de Tumbes

First stage

Liga Departamental de Ucayali

First stage

|-
|}

Liguilla

References

External links 
 DeChalaca.com – copaperu.pe la información más completa del "fútbol macho" en todo el Perú

2012
5